Chip Lain (born October 5, 1958) is an American former stock car racing driver who competed in the NASCAR Late Model Sportsman Series (now the NASCAR Xfinity Series) between 1982 and 1983. During this time, Lain competed in 19 races, failing to reach the top 10 and achieving a career best 12th at Hickory Motor Speedway in 1983. Lain owned Connie Saylor's car for four races in 1985. He was also crew chief for Frank Fleming in six races during the 1990 season. He currently is an instructor and the program director for the Richard Childress Race car Technology program at Forsyth Technical Community College.

Motorsports career results

NASCAR
(key) (Bold – Pole position awarded by qualifying time. Italics – Pole position earned by points standings or practice time. * – Most laps led.)

Budweiser Late Model Sportsman Series

References

External links
 
 
 

1958 births
NASCAR drivers
NASCAR team owners
Racing drivers from North Carolina
Living people
NASCAR crew chiefs